Daintee is a company based in Sri Lanka that produces confectionery and other food products. It is the market leader in confectionery sales in Sri Lanka.

History

Daintee Limited was founded in 1984 and Daintee Foods Limited in 1996 with the aim of providing the Sri Lankan market with new and improved quality sugar confectionery products.  The companies now produce a very large product range consisting of over 75 products such as candies, toffees, jellies, chocolates, gum, desserts, biscuits, sugar free confectionery, snacks, breakfast cereals, teas, and noodles. These are marketed in Sri Lanka as well as several other countries under brand names such as Daintee, Milady, Bensons, Chito, X-tra, Mr Bitz, Longlive and Denmi.

Some of the products are noted for their health benefits, especially for diabetics.

Sugar Free Confectionery

In 2010 Daintee launched a range of sugar free confectionery under the brand name Longlive.  The products contain xylitol, a premium sugar substitute that has been recommended as promoting dental health. 
Xylitol is a type of carbohydrate (C5H12O5) that is naturally found in many plants and animals, including those that are part of the human diet. For example, it is found in mushrooms, sweet corn, berries, cauliflower.
No matter what we eat, 5-15g is made in our bodies every day during normal metabolism.

Xylitol has a very low glycemic index of 13 compared to glucose which has an index of 100.
Xylitol is also low in calories: sugar has 4kcal/g whereas xylitol has just 2.4kcal/g.  
Xylitol is also able to reduce the risk of dental caries (tooth decay). 
For example, during a study in Finland, over 100 young adults were either given chewing gum made with sucrose (sugar) gum or xylitol. The people who ate sucrose gum had nearly three times as many decayed, missing or filled teeth than the people who ate xylitol gum.

A recent review article by Professor R.L. Wijeyeweera BDS, Ph.D. (Former Dean, Faculty of
Dental Sciences, and currently Professor in Paedodontics, University of Peradeniya) published in the Sri Lankan Dental Journal clearly highlights the benefits of chewing gum containing xylitol.

Certifications

Daintee is the only Sri Lankan confectionery company to have been awarded the ISO-9001:2008 accreditation, which is internationally certified, as well as the SLS Mark from the Sri Lanka Standards Institution.

Awards

Daintee 40+ Grain Flakes, a cereal with green gram and kurakkan, was awarded "Most Innovative Product" and "Best Product with Local Materials" by the Sri Lanka Food Processors Association at Pro Foods 2009. 
Daintee Kurakkan Crunch won awards in 2007.

X-Tra TV Programmes

The Daintee X-TRA T.V. programmes are very popular singing contests.  The first series was Daintee Lamatharu, which gave children from all over the country a unique opportunity to compete on the national stage.  The 40+ programmes gave a chance for citizens over 40 to showcase their singing talents.

References

External links
  Daintee Homepage
  Sri Lanka Food Processors Association

Chocolate companies
Confectionery companies
Food and drink companies established in 1984
Food and drink companies of Sri Lanka
Sri Lankan brands
Sri Lankan companies established in 1984